KWAK (1240 AM) is a radio station broadcasting an oldies format. Licensed to Stuttgart, Arkansas, United States, the station is currently owned by Arkansas County Broadcasters, Inc.

Programming
Along with its usual oldies programming, KWAK is an affiliate of the Tennessee Titans radio network.

History
KWAK began broadcasting in May 1948 on 1240 kHz with 250 W power (full-time). Owned by Arkansas Airwaves Company, it was a Mutual affiliate and was "fed many programs from KXLR, North Little Rock, a sister station."

References

External links

WAK
Stuttgart, Arkansas